Elsie Bernice Washington (December 28, 1942 – May 5, 2009) was an American author whose 1980 work  Entwined Destinies has been considered the first romance novel written by an African-American author featuring African-American characters.

Early life and education
Washington was born in New York on December 28, 1942, to Samuel Washington and Kathleen Peterson Erby. She majored in English at the City College of New York, graduating with a bachelor's degree.

Career
After completing college, she worked as a writer, and later as an editor, for several publications, including The New York Post, Essence, Life and Newsweek.

Her one and only novel, Entwined Destinies, was published by Dell Publishing in 1980 under the pen name Rosalind Welles as the 575th in its "Candlelight Romance" series of books. The book, which tells the story of a female African-American magazine reporter who finds true love with an African-American oil executive, was described as "the first known romance featuring African-American characters written by an African-American author" in a 2002 issue of Black Issues Book Review.  By the time of Washington's death, several imprints were devoted to black romance novels, featuring books by authors such as Rochelle Alers, Beverly Jenkins and Sandra Kitt.

In 1996, the Milwaukee Journal Sentinel called Washington the "mother of the African-American romance", setting the groundwork for a revolution in ethnic romance novels.  Washington's book was the first "ethnic romance", a category conceived by Vivian Stephens, an African-American editor at Dell, viewing the book as the first of other such books also aimed at Native Americans and Chinese Americans.  The company published 125,000 copies of Washington's novel, primarily distributed in cities on the East Coast with large African-American populations.

Washington also wrote two works of non-fiction, her 1974 book Sickle Cell Anemia, co-written with Anthony Cerami, and the Uncivil War: The Struggle Between Black Men and Women, published in 1996.  A 1998 article she wrote for Essence magazine received notice after she criticized the trend of African Americans who comported to "white standards of beauty" through the use of tinted contact lenses and other techniques.

Death
A resident of Yonkers, New York, Washington died in Manhattan at the age of 66 on May 5, 2009, due to multiple sclerosis and cancer.  She was survived by her parents and a brother.

References

1942 births
2009 deaths
20th-century American novelists
African-American novelists
American romantic fiction writers
American women novelists
Deaths from cancer in New York (state)
City College of New York alumni
Neurological disease deaths in New York (state)
Deaths from multiple sclerosis
People from Yonkers, New York
Writers from the Bronx
Women romantic fiction writers
20th-century American women writers
Novelists from New York (state)
20th-century African-American women writers
20th-century African-American writers
21st-century African-American people
21st-century African-American women